Greenwich Castle was a hunting lodge used during the reign of Henry VIII, located in Greenwich Park, in Greenwich, England. The Royal Observatory, Greenwich now stands on the site. Greenwich Castle was apparently a favourite place for Henry VIII to house his mistresses, as it was within easy travelling distance of Greenwich Palace at the foot of the hill.

The castle was previously known as Duke Humphrey's Tower after its builder, Humphrey, Duke of Gloucester, a younger brother of King Henry V.

References

Former buildings and structures in the Royal Borough of Greenwich
Tudor royal palaces in England
Royal residences in the Royal Borough of Greenwich
Royal residences in the United Kingdom
Castles in London
Greenwich Park
Former castles in England